The WPA 10-Ball World Championship 2011 was the third edition of the WPA World 10-ball Championship, the world championship for the discipline of 10-ball pool. It took place from May 9 to 15, 2011. The qualification phase was hosted at the Star Billiards Center, in Quezon City while the final tournament which started from May 10, 2011 was hosted at the World Trade Center Manila in Pasay.

Dutch Huidji See won the event, defeating China's Fu Jianbo in the final 11–8. The defending champion Mika Immonen lost in the last 64 round against Tomoo Takano.

Format
The 128 participating players were divided into 16 groups, in which they competed in a double elimination tournament against each other. The remaining 64 players in each group qualified for the final round played in the knockout system. The event saw players from 44 different countries.

Prize money
Below was the advertised prize fund for the event.

Knockout round

References

External links
 WPA World 10-Ball Championship 2011 at azbilliards.com

2011
WPA World Ten-ball Championship
WPA World Ten-ball Championship
International sports competitions hosted by the Philippines